James Gilman (17 March 1879 – 14 September 1976) was an English cricketer who played first-class cricket for London County, Middlesex and Cambridge University from 1900 to 1904.

Gilman was educated at St Paul's School in London and Jesus College, Cambridge. An electrical engineer, he served as major in the Royal Army Service Corps in World War One.

At 97 years and 182 days when he died in 1976, Gilman was Middlesex's longest-lived player until Rusi Cooper overtook his record in 2020.

References

1879 births
1976 deaths
People from Marylebone
People educated at St Paul's School, London
Alumni of Jesus College, Cambridge
English cricketers
Middlesex cricketers
London County cricketers
Cambridge University cricketers
Marylebone Cricket Club cricketers
Northumberland cricketers
Royal Army Service Corps soldiers
British Army personnel of World War I